All the Green Year is a 1980 Australian television series based on a novel about three boys growing up near Melbourne on the eve of the Great Depression.

It is based on the book of the same name by Don Charlwood, first published in 1965. The book sold over 100,000 copies and has come to be regarded as an Australian classic.

Cast
Greg Stroud as Johnno
Darius Perkins as Charlie
Jamie Adamson
Sally Cooper
Carl Hansen
Monica Maughan
Alan Hopgood
Larry Held
Tracey Kelly as Eileen

Production
The novel was published in 1965 and was acclaimed. It was set as a text for high school students studying English Literature in the 1960s.

In 1977 it was announced the ABC would make a TV series based on the book. Filming did not take place until mid 1980.

Although most of the series was set in Frankston, it was shot in Flinders.

References

External links

Information about novel at AustLit (Subscription required)

Australian television films
1980 television films
1980 films
Films directed by Douglas Sharp